Agrotis cremata (Maui agrotis noctuid moth) was a moth in the family Noctuidae. It is now presumed extinct.

Before its extinction, it was endemic to Maui, Hawaii, United States. It has not been seen in over 100 years.

Sources

 2006 IUCN Red List of Threatened Species.   
Hawaii's Extinct Species - Insects

Agrotis
Endemic moths of Hawaii
Moths described in 1880